Weightlifting at the 2018 Asian Games was held at the Jakarta International Expo Hall A, Jakarta, Indonesia, from 20 to 27 August 2018.

China and Kazakhstan did not participate as their weightlifting federations were suspended by the IWF from October 2017 to October 2018.

Schedule

Medalists

Men

Women

Medal table

Participating nations
A total of 164 athletes from 29 nations competed in weightlifting at the 2018 Asian Games:

References

External links
Weightlifting at the 2018 Asian Games 
Results
Results book

 
2018 Asian Games events
2018
Asian Games
Asian Games